CSS Gaines was a wooden side wheel gunboat, weighing 863 tons, constructed by the Confederates at Mobile, Alabama, during 1861–62. The ship was hastily built with unseasoned wood, which was partially covered with 2-inch iron plating. Gaines resembled CSS Morgan except that she had high pressure boilers. Operating in the waters of Mobile Bay, under the command of Lieutenant John W. Bennett, CSN, she was heavily damaged during the Battle of Mobile Bay on August 5, 1864. Two crewman died in the engagement, 3-4 were wounded, and 129 escaped to Mobile. Her hull may have been located in Mobile Bay in 1989, but the find has not been confirmed.

References

Gunboats of the Confederate States Navy
Ships built in Mobile, Alabama
1862 ships
Shipwrecks of the American Civil War
Shipwrecks of the Alabama coast
Maritime incidents in August 1864